The Germany national rugby league team is the national rugby league team of Germany.

National team
The captain of the national side is Brad Billsborough. Bob Doughton is head coach. The most capped player is Liam Doughton who has 24 Caps.

As well as playing friendlies, the team currently competes in  European Championship C. They also play against the Netherlands  in the annual Griffin Cup. In October 2022, Germany won the 10th edition of the Griffin Cup, defeating the Netherlands 29-24.

In the Central Europe Development Tri-Nations in 2006 they won both of their matches narrowly beating Austria in Bad Reichenhall in front of over 350 people. They then beat Estonia in Tallinn to seal victory of the competition.

Coaching staff

2022 squad

Notable players 

 Jimmy Keinhorst
 Kristian Keinhorst
 Nick Keinhorst
 Markus Keinhorst
 Liam Doughton
 Jared Blanke
 Uwe Jansen
 Brad Billsborough
 Ben Dent
 Simon Cooper
 Dan Stocks

Eligible Players

  Scott Drinkwater
  Josh Drinkwater
  David Klemmer
  Adam Quinlan
  Jared Blanke
  Josh Coric
  Tom Johnstone
  Ryan Millar
  Ben White
  Adam Ryder
  Asu Kepaoa
  Dylan Brown
  Jamie Murphy

Competitive record

Overall

European Championship B
Since 2007, Germany has been a participant in the European Shield, the successor to the Central Europe Tri-Nations. In the 2007 Shield, they were beaten in Heidelberg by a strong Serbia side but beat the Czech Republic in Prague, subsequently finishing second.

In the 2008 European Shield, Germany again defeated the Czech team.  However, they lost to the subsequent champions Italy and again took second for the tournament.

The 2009 European Shield featured the same three sides as in 2008.  The first match of the tournament saw Germany lose to the Czech Republic 30–4 in Olomouc.  That game marked the first international victory for the Czech team.

In the 2010 European Shield, Germany lost to the subsequent group winners Serbia and defeated the Czech team, finishing in the second place.

European Championship C

Results

See also

 Rugby league in Germany

References

External links 
Rugby League European Federation Website
Rugby League International Federation Website 

Rugby league
Germany
National rugby league team